FirstCash Holdings is an American company focused on operating of pawn stores in the U.S. and Latin America and offering credit services such as secured and unsecured loans, payday loans, rent-to-own, among other services. Incorporated in Delaware but headquartered in Fort Worth, Texas, the company's stock is traded on Nasdaq. In September 2016, Nasdaq-listed Cash America merged with NYSE-listed FirstCash and in 2018 FirstCash moved its stock to Nasdaq. In December 2021, the company acquired American First Finance.

History
Jack Daugherty founded Cash America in 1983 (possibly 1984), after prior experience running a pawn shop and a failed venture hunting for oil. He reinvested his earnings into acquiring more pawn shops, growing his business to 36 locations by 1987 and 101 at the end of 1988. Daugherty resigned as CEO in 1999 in favor of company president Daniel R. Feehan, though he remained involved with the company as chairman of the board. Feehan similarly retired in 2015 and assumed the chairmanship; Daugherty stepped down but continued to serve on the board.

Acquisitions
In 2010, it acquired Maxit Financial.

In 2021, FirstCash entered the "buy now, pay later" payments industry with the acquisition of American First Finance. The deal was announced on October 28 with a value of $1.17 billion, and closed on December 16 with a final value of $916 million.

Controversies and Lawsuits
In November 2021, the Consumer Financial Protection Bureau filed a lawsuit against FirstCash and its subsidiary, Cash America West, for alleged violations of the Military Lending Act and a 2013 CFPB order against the same. While the Military Lending Act prohibits loans to servicemembers and their families with annual interest above 36%, the CFPB accused the company of making thousands of loans with interest rates as high as 200%.

In September 2022, the company paid $379,125.73 to 253 workers in Seattle, Washington, in order to settle claims that it violated the city's minimum wage, break time, and leave laws. As part of the settlement, it also paid $4,746.96 to the city of Seattle.

References 

American companies established in 1984
Financial services companies established in 1984
Retail companies established in 1984
Companies formerly listed on the New York Stock Exchange
Companies listed on the Nasdaq
Pawn shops
Companies based in Fort Worth, Texas
Retail companies of the United States